Buenoa confusa is a species of backswimmer in the family Notonectidae. It is found in the Caribbean, Central America, and North America.

References

Notonectidae
Articles created by Qbugbot
Insects described in 1953